Submerge (and its variants) means to be covered by something (usually a liquid), such as being underwater:

 Submerged arc welding
 Submerged continent
 Submerged forest
 Submerged floating tunnel
 Submerged specific gravity
 Submergent coastline
 Submergent plant
 Submersible
 Submersible bridge
 Submersible drilling rig
 Submersible mixer
 Submersisphaeria, submerged fungi genus
 Ceratophyllum submersum, submerged, free-floating, aquatic plant
 the action of a submarine of diving below the surface of water

Submerge, Submerged, or Submersed may also refer to:

 Submerge, 1998 album by the Japanese alternative rock band Coaltar of the Deepers
 Submerge (nightclub), Indian nightclub
 Submerged (2000 film), a 2000 film
 Submerged (2005 film), a 2005 film
 Submerged (2016 film), a 2016 film
 Submerged (video game), a 2015 video game
 Submerged, a one-act play written in 1929 by Clay Shaw and Herman Stuart Cottman
 Submerged, a 2001 TV movie docudrama about the USS Squalus (SS-192)
 Submerged (DJ), alias of Kurt Gluck, Brooklyn-based disc jockey
 Submerged Records, a record label
 Submersed, American rock band

See also
 Submersion (disambiguation)
 Drown
 Flood
 Reservoir
 Aquis Submersus (Latin for Water Drowning), painting and novella